David L. Hough (born 1937) is an American writer on motorcycle rider safety, education and training. 
He has been a columnist for Motorcycle Consumer News, Sound RIDER! and BMW Owners News magazines. After his first book Proficient Motorcycling was published by Bow Tie Press it became one of the best selling motorcycle books. He currently has four published books and one 2nd ed. He has been recognized twice as a writer by the  Motorcycle Safety Foundation's (MSF) Excellence in Motorcycle Journalism award.

Career 
He has also designed a rider skills course for sidecar riders. Hough has been called "a premier motorcycling journalist" and the author of "one of the most widely respected books on safe street riding." In the media he is frequently called upon to provide expert commentary on motorcycling issues, and his work is on the recommended reading lists of many other motorcycling writers.

Hough was inducted to the AMA Motorcycle Hall of Fame in December 2009 for his work as a motorcycle journalist and riding safety books that "should be a mandatory read for every motorcyclist, from novice to expert."

Bibliography
  (2008 2nd ed. )

List of reading recommendations 
Motorcycling recommended reading lists that include David Hough's books.

References

External links

 Proficient Motorycling columns archive at MCN
 Book review and biographical information at Sound Rider

Living people
American instructional writers
Writers from Port Angeles, Washington
Motorcycling writers
Motorcycle training
1937 births